Binod  was a meme that became viral in India in August 2020. It originated from a comment by a user with the screen name Binod, who had added only the word "Binod" in the comment section of a YouTube video. This was followed by a video uploaded to YouTube by Slayy Point, mocking "Binod" and YouTube comments sections in general.

Background  
On 15 July 2020, the YouTube channel Slayy Point uploaded a video called "Why Indian Comments Section is Garbage (BINOD)". The video made fun of a user who had written a comment saying only "Binod", which was subsequently "liked" by seven users.

Spread 
The video triggered an online trend among Indians as they typed their names as comments or reviews; later, the term "Binod" started being used in social media posts and comments. The name soon turned into a meme; on live streams of YouTube videos, "Binod" was spammed in the live chats.

The name Binod initially sparked memes on Paytm, Twitter, Mumbai Police, Amazon Prime Video, Netflix, Tinder, Airtel, Disney+ Hotstar and Swiggy, which also posted Binod memes after the emergence of the trend. Paytm temporarily changed its Twitter username after a request from a user.

Netflix India referred to the Binod meme on Instagram. State Bank of India and Mumbai Police also made use of Binod memes to warn people against online frauds.

References 

Internet memes introduced in 2020
Internet trolling
2020 in India